Inas El Degheidy (born 10 March 1953) is an Egyptian film director.

Inas directs films of social and realistic essence, often by using explicit scenes; this has made her being labelled as "controversial".  While her films often analyze women's struggles in society, she does not like the term "women's cinema".

Life
Inas El Degheidy was born in Cairo, one of eight children of a conservative, middle-class family. Her father taught Arabic. while he was strict, he was the only one to support her in her family when she wanted to go to film school. She graduated from the Cinema Institute in 1975, and directed her first film Pardon Law in 1985.

Her movie Al-Samt (Silence) tackles the subject of a woman sexually abused by her father. The Egyptian Board of Censors has demanded that the script be modified to ensure the father is portrayed as mentally diseased and thus unrepresentative of the general Egyptian male figure.

Films
 `Afwan ayuha al-qanun (Pardon, Law), 1985
 al-Tahhadi (The Challenge), 1988
 Zaman al-mamnu` (Age of the Forbidden), 1988
 Imra`a wahida la takfi (One Woman is Not Enough), 1990
 Qadiyat Samiha Badran (The Case of Samiha Badran), 1992
 al-Qatila (Lady Killer), 1992
 Discu disku (Disco, Disco), 1993
 Lahm rakhis (Cheap Flesh), 1994
 Istakoza (Lobster), 1996
 Dantilla (Lace), 1998. Winner of best director at Pusan Film Festival.
 Kalam al-layl (Night Whispers), 1999
 al-Warda al-hamra (The Red Rose), 2000
 Mudhakkarat murahiqa (Diary of a Teenage Girl), 2001
 Night Talk, 2002
 Al-Bahithat `an al-huriya (Looking for Freedom), 2004

References

External links
 
 Egyptian posters for films directed by Inas Al Degheidy

1953 births
Living people
Egyptian film directors
Egyptian women film directors